Kung Jin is a character in the Mortal Kombat fighting game series developed by NetherRealm Studios. He is first introduced in 2015's Mortal Kombat X as a relative of Kung Lao, one of the series' primary heroes. Like him, Kung Jin is trained in Shaolin martial arts and a defender of Earth ("Earthrealm" within series lore) from malevolent extraplanar forces. As a playable character in Mortal Kombat X, he is presented as a fighter who specializes in archery: he carries a bow into battle, which he utilizes for both melee and ranged attacks. He is voiced by Johnny Yong Bosch.

Kung Jin is gay and is the first confirmed LGBTQ character of the Mortal Kombat series. His sexual orientation is hinted in passing during a story-driven flashback sequence. The revelation attracted significant media attention and discussion about the representation of LGBTQ characters in the Mortal Kombat series as well as fighting games in general.

Concept and design
Kung Jin was introduced as a relative of Kung Lao in preview trailers and gameplay streams for Mortal Kombat X uploaded in March 2015. According to NetherRealm Studios, Kung Jin's default costume was inspired by Mongolian nomadic archers, with him wearing it as a symbol of his acceptance of his role as a hero. Johnny Yong Bosch is credited as the voice actor for Kung Jin in Mortal Kombat X. Lewis Tan played Kung Jin for the unreleased web series Mortal Kombat X: Generations.

Although not explicitly stated in Mortal Kombat X, Kung Jin was confirmed as the series' first gay character by NetherRealms Studios employee Dominic Cianciolo on social media. A notable example of in-game dialogue which alludes to his sexuality involve a conversation between him and Raiden, where the latter convinces him to continue the legacy of his kinsmen who were Shaolin monks. Kung Jin expresses his fear of the Shaolin not accepting him for who is, but Raiden responds by telling him, "They care only about what is in your heart. Not whom your heart desires." A potential dialogue exchange between Kung Jin and Tanya prior to their fight confirms his lack of interest in members of the opposite sex.

Appearances
In Mortal Kombat X, Kung Jin is introduced as a descendant of the legendary Earthrealm hero, the Great Kung Lao, and a cousin of Kung Lao, who is an undead revenant corrupted by the evil Elder God Shinnok during the game's events. As a member of the White Lotus Society, a faction co-founded by the Shaolin Order of Light and Raiden, the immortal protector of Earthrealm, he fights alongside Cassie Cage's military unit in order to repel the hostile forces of Outworld and the Netherrealm. According to the character's backstory, he moved with his family to the United States after Kung Lao's death where they live in poverty. He originally operated as a thief until Raiden convinced him to abandon his criminal activities and train with the Shaolin at their Wu Shi Academy.

Kung Jin appears as a playable character in Mortal Kombat Mobile, a tie-in mobile game for Mortal Kombat X. He appears Issue #12 of the tie-in comic to Mortal Kombat X of the same name, a prequel miniseries that is set before the in-game storyline.

Kung Jin does not appear for Mortal Kombat 11, though he is referenced in passing. He is established through retroactive continuity as Kung Lao's nephew.

Reception
Kung Jin's appearance in Mortal Kombat X received a mixed commentary from reviewers. Sam Machkovech said Kung Jin, whose staff could be turned into a bow for cross-screen arrow action, is a good example of a character who offers a playstyle that was never seen before in a Mortal Kombat game. Writing for Kotaku, Evan Narcisse was initially skeptical of Kung Jin's appeal as a playable character, but found himself drawn to the character's moveset, which involved quick strikes with options for keeping opponents at a distance as a play style. On the other hand, Chris Carter in his review of  Mortal Kombat X  for Destructoid was dismissive of the character, whom he described as a "wasted" roster slot. Gavin Jasper from Den of Geek ranked Kung Jin 52nd in their 2019 list of the series' playable characters, deeming his personality the "most boring" of Mortal Kombat Xs new characters.

The flashback cutscene which alludes to the character's sexual orientation received significant coverage from media outlets, beginning with Gay Star News initial interpretation of the character beat and subsequent confirmation by Cianciolo as an LGBT theme. Jef Rouner from the Houston Press and Paul Tassi from Forbes emphasized the importance of the reveal in spite of its subtle nature, noting Kung Jin as potentially the first openly gay playable character in a fighting game, and one of very few LGBTQ characters to exist in the genre as a whole. Vikki Blake from Destructoid agreed that the reveal was subtle, but suggested that it did present Kung Jin as a character who potentially has one of the game’s richest and most interesting backstories. Indonesian media outlet Liputan 6 reported that overall fan reception towards the reveal had been divisive, but noted that some players believed that Kung Jin's sexuality had little relevance to their actual opinion of the character. Rouner drew attention to backlash against the confirmation of the character's identity from a segment of the video game community, denouncing what he described as homophobia or a deliberate effort to demean representations of characters who do not conform to their worldview. Writing for Paste, Todd Harper described the nature of Kung Jin's presentation as an LGBT character to be "complicated", and that he had mixed feelings over the issue: on one hand, he was pleased that with Kung Jin, NetherRealm Studios made a solid effort with the respectful representation of a queer Asian man, an underrepresented demographic in popular media. On the other hand, Harper raised concerns about the potential for Kung Jin's identity to be tastefully presented in a "consistently meaningful but not overpowering" without resorting to harmful stereotyping or tropes, citing as comparison examples he considered to be troubling like Poison from the Street Fighter series.

In light of his confirmed identity as a gay man, James Kozanitis from GameRevolution ranked Kung Jin in their 2016 list of the five most memorable LGBT characters in video games. In January 2019, Ella Braidwood from Pink News reported on social media reactions towards the initial announcement of Mortal Kombat 11 roster, and noted that a substantial number of series fans wanted to see Kung Jin's return as a playable character. Jasper though the character had potential as a "silver-tongued member of the new generation of heroes" who is driven to social banditry as a result of his sympathies with the impoverished masses and that the allusion to his sexuality in the cutscene was "really sweet, well done, and very welcome", but expressed disappointment over the character underutilization following his first appearance in Mortal Kombat X.

References

See also
Chinese archery

DC Comics characters
LGBT characters in comics
LGBT characters in video games
Fictional archers
Fictional Chinese American people
Fictional Chinese people in video games
Fictional criminals in video games
Fictional gay males
Fictional martial artists in video games
Fictional military personnel in video games
Fictional professional thieves
Fictional Shaolin kung fu practitioners
Male characters in video games
Mortal Kombat characters
Video game characters introduced in 2015
Video game protagonists